Indrayani is a village and former Village Development Committee that is now part of Shankharapur Municipality in Kathmandu District in Province No. 3 of central Nepal. At the time of the 1991 Nepal census it had a population of 2,635 and had 467 households in it. As per 2011 Nepal census it had a population of 3,361 and had 717 households in it.

References

Populated places in Kathmandu District